Thirsty Work is the twenty-first studio album by English rock band Status Quo.  It yielded three hit singles, "I Didn't Mean It" (No. 21), "Sherri Don't Fail Me Now" (No. 38), and the uncharacteristic ballad "Restless" (No. 39). "Goin' Nowhere" was released as a single in Germany. "Sorry" had originally been recorded by Demis Roussos and released on his 1980 album Man of the World, with Francis Rossi and Bernie Frost on all instruments and backing vocals.

Track listing 

 "Goin' Nowhere" (Francis Rossi, Bernie Frost, Tony McAnaney) 3:50
 "I Didn't Mean It" (John David) 3:22
 "Confidence" (Andy Bown) 3:14
 "Point of No Return" (Andy Bown, John Edwards) 3:50
 "Sail Away" (Francis Rossi, Bernie Frost) 3:34
 "Like It or Not" (Francis Rossi. Bernie Frost) 4:01
 "Soft in the Head" (Francis Rossi, Bernie Frost) 3:20
 "Queenie" (Francis Rossi, Bernie Frost) 3:32
 "Lover of the Human Race" (Francis Rossi, Andy Bown) 3:32
 "Sherri, Don't Fail Me Now!" (Andy Bown, John Edwards) 3:20
 "Rude Awakening Time" (Francis Rossi, Bernie Frost) 4:12
 "Back on My Feet" (Francis Rossi, Bernie Frost) 3:06
 "Restless" (Jennifer Warnes) 4:10
 "Ciao-Ciao" (Francis Rossi, Andy Bown) 3:31
 "Tango" (Francis Rossi, Bernie Frost) 4:06
 "Sorry" (Francis Rossi, Bernie Frost) 3:28

2006 reissue bonus tracks

"Survival" (Francis Rossi, Andy Bown)
"She Knew Too Much" (Francis Rossi, Andy Bown)
"Tossin & Turning" (Francis Rossi, Bernie Frost)
"Down To You" (Francis Rossi, Andy Bown)
"Beautiful" (Francis Rossi, Andy Bown)

Personnel
Status Quo
Francis Rossi - vocals, lead guitar
Rick Parfitt - vocals, guitar
John Edwards - bass
Andy Bown - keyboards
Jeff Rich - drums
Recorded at ARSIS Studios

Chart positions

References 

1994 albums
Polydor Records albums
Status Quo (band) albums